The 1996 OFC Men's Olympic Qualifying Tournament determined which Oceania Football Confederation (OFC) teams would qualify for playoff to compete at the 1996 Summer Olympics men's football tournament.

Notes

References 

OFC Men's Olympic Qualifying Tournament